Moreno Veloso  (born November 22, 1972) is a Brazilian  musician and singer.

Early life 
His parents are Brazilian singer Caetano Veloso and his first wife Andréa Gadelha (Dedé) Veloso. Brazilian singer Gal Costa is Moreno Veloso's godmother.

Veloso studied physics at the Federal University of Rio de Janeiro. He turned later to music and singing. In 2000, he recorded his first album, Máquina de Escrever Música (English: Music Typewriter), but his songwriting debut came in 1982 with "Um Canto de Afoxé para o Bloco Do Ile", a reference to African mythology.

In 1998, Veloso collaborated with Sadjo Djolo Koiate on the track "Coral" for the AIDS benefit compilation album Onda Sonora: Red Hot + Lisbon produced by the Red Hot Organization.

Again in 2011, he contributed to the song "Águas de Março" that featured ATOM™ Toshiyuki Yasuda and Fernanda Takai for the Red Hot Organization's charitable album Red Hot+Rio 2. The album is a follow-up to the 1996, Red Hot + Rio. Proceeds from the sales were donated to raise awareness and money to fight AIDS/HIV and related health and social issues.

One of Moreno Veloso's music groups is called Moreno + 2, including Moreno Veloso, Alexandre Kassin and Domênico Lancelotti.

Partial discography
 Moreno+2: Máquina de Escrever Música (2000, ROCKiT!)
 Released by Luaka Bop first as Moreno Veloso+2: Music Typewriter (2001)
 Domenico+2: Sincerely Hot (2003, Luaka Bop)
 Kassin+2: Futurismo (2007, Luaka Bop)
 Moreno Veloso: Coisa Boa (2014, Disco Maravilha)

References

External links
 Music Typewriter. The Verve Music Group page, accessed on May 30, 2006.

1972 births
Living people
21st-century Brazilian male singers
21st-century Brazilian singers
People from Salvador, Bahia
Orquestra Imperial members
Latin music record producers